Khinwasar or Kheenwasar or Khiwasar is a village in Laxmangarh tehsil in Sikar district of Rajasthan state in India. It is located at a distance of 15 km east of Laxmangarh. It gets name from the founder person named Khinwa Thori, a Hindu Jat, about 200 years back. Village has got some signs of old habitations.

It has a population of 2,240 people, half of whom are Jats. Major Jat gotra of the village is Chilka about 100 families. All Chilka people are believed to have spread from this village. Other Jat Gotras living in the village with number of families are Mahla (6), Kaler (2), Bhinchar (7), Bhakar (4), Sewda (1), and Kajala (8).
Other castes are Rajput (50), Brahman (6), Muslim (50), Meghwal (50), Gusain (20) and Meenas (10).

Demographics
Of 2,240 people, 1,174 are males and 1,066 are females. There are 367 households, making it 6.10 people per household.

Village government
Khinwasar gram  Panchayat. Villages Khinwasar, J.P.nagar, Poshani, Ramchandra ka baas and Panlava under Khinwasar gram panchayat.

Transportation
Khinwasar is connected by a two lane asphalt road to Laxmangarh and Nawalgarh. Nawalgarh Railway station,  from Khinwasar is the nearest railway station, which is  well connected to Jaipur, Delhi and other cities.

Games and sports
Most of the children play cricket. Some villagers also play volleyball and football. Villagers can be seen playing cards in chaupal (village common area).

Festivals
Villagers celebrate all major Hindu festivals. Some of the major festivals are Holi, Deepawali, Makar Sankranti, Raksha Bandhan, Sawan, Teej, and Gauga Peer, Gangaur.

Festivals
Villagers celebrate all major Hindu festivals. Some of the major festivals are Holi, Deepawali, Makar Sankranti, Raksha Bandhan, Sawan, Teej, and Gauga Peer, Gangaur.

NREGA scheme
National Rural Employment Guaranteed scheme has been implemented in the village. A total of 25 village households worked under the scheme. A complete list can be found from the NREGA website

References

External links
 Google map view of Khinsawar Electric Substation
 Details of sarpanch in Sikar
 List of all villages of Rajasthan with their panchayat samiti
 Voter List of Khinwasar panchayat samiti
 Sikar district official web page
 List of all the land records

Villages in Sikar district